Neoregelia lilliputiana is a species of flowering plant in the genus Neoregelia. This species is endemic to Brazil.

Cultivars

 Neoregelia 'Bits & Pieces'
 Neoregelia 'Black Devil'
 Neoregelia 'Black Tracker'
 Neoregelia 'Bromanza'
 Neoregelia 'Bromlust'
 Neoregelia 'Cat Nap'
 Neoregelia 'Chiquita Linda'
 Neoregelia 'Cougar'
 Neoregelia 'Dark Mood'
 Neoregelia 'Dolly'
 Neoregelia 'Felix'
 Neoregelia 'Flare Up'
 Neoregelia 'Gene McKenzie'
 Neoregelia 'Gold Pass'
 Neoregelia 'Gold Pass Too'
 Neoregelia 'Grace's Avalanche'
 Neoregelia 'Grace's Candelabra'
 Neoregelia 'Grace's Focus'
 Neoregelia 'Holly'
 Neoregelia 'Janet Sue'
 Neoregelia 'Jolly'
 Neoregelia 'Lili Marlene'
 Neoregelia 'Lillipet'
 Neoregelia lilliputiana × (carolinae × 'Painted Lady')
 Neoregelia 'Little Jewel'
 Neoregelia 'Little Storm'
 Neoregelia 'Little Tart'
 Neoregelia 'Littlie'
 Neoregelia 'Lullaby'
 Neoregelia 'Millie'
 Neoregelia 'Molly'
 Neoregelia 'Murky Secrets'
 Neoregelia 'Night Spot'
 Neoregelia 'Only Child'
 Neoregelia 'Outrigger'
 Neoregelia 'Pedra do Padre'
 Neoregelia 'Phoebe'
 Neoregelia 'Polly'
 Neoregelia 'Pussy Foot'
 Neoregelia 'Quoll'
 Neoregelia 'Roundabout'
 Neoregelia 'Small Fry'
 Neoregelia 'Spotted Devil'
 Neoregelia 'Tabby'
 Neoregelia 'Tassie Tiger'
 Neoregelia 'Tiger Tim'
 Neoregelia 'Tweedle Dum'
 Neoregelia 'Tweedledee'
 Neoregelia 'Voodoo Magic'
 Neoregelia 'Wicked'
 Neoregelia 'Wild Cat Too'
 Neoregelia 'Willy Nilly'
 Neoregelia 'Witchcraft'

References

BSI Cultivar Registry Retrieved 11 October 2009

lilliputiana
Flora of Brazil